The following article comprises past and present players and results of the Hockeyroos, the national women's field hockey team from Australia. The team is controlled by Hockey Australia and competes in FIH sanctioned tournaments.

Team

Technical staff
Head Coach: Paul Gaudoin
Assistant Coaches: Katie Allen, Stephanie Andrews and Katrina Powell

Current squad
The following players were named in the 2020 national squad in an announcement on 5 December 2019.

Development squad
In addition to the core 27 player squad, Hockey Australia also maintains an 18 player development squad. The 2020 squad is as follows:

 Hannah Astbury (GK)
 Kristina Bates
 Roos Broek
 Ashlea Fey
 Savannah Fitzpatrick
 Morgan Gallagher 
 Rebecca Greiner
 Nicola Hammond
 Hayley Padget
 Candyce Peacock
 Meg Pearce 
 Aleisha Power (GK)
 Michaela Spano
 Penny Squibb
 Tina Taseska 
 Shanea Tonkin
 Britt Wilkinson
 Abigail Wilson

Past squads

2001–2010

Head coach: David Bell

Head coach: David Bell

Head coach: David Bell

Head coach: David Bell

Head coach: Frank Murray

Head coach: Frank Murray

Head coach: Frank Murray

Head coach: Frank Murray

Head coach: Frank Murray

Head coach: Frank Murray

2011–2020

Head coach: Adam Commens

Head coach: Adam Commens

Head coach: Adam Commens

Head coach: Adam Commens

Head coach: Adam Commens

Head coach: Adam Commens

Head coach: Paul Gaudoin

Head coach: Paul Gaudoin

Head coach: Paul Gaudoin

Head coach: Paul Gaudoin

Player recognition
In 1998, the FIH introduced the Player of the Year Awards, recognising those deemed to be the be the best in the world. The following table includes Australian players who have won an award or received nominations.

 Winner of Award

Results
Australia women's national field hockey team results (2006–10)
Australia women's national field hockey team results (2011–15)
Australia women's national field hockey team results (2016–20)

References

Records
Women's field hockey teams in Australia
Oceanian women's national field hockey teams